Events from the year 1888 in Scotland.

Incumbents 

 Secretary for Scotland and Keeper of the Great Seal – The Marquess of Lothian

Law officers 
 Lord Advocate – John Macdonald until October; then James Robertson
 Solicitor General for Scotland – James Robertson; then Moir Tod Stormonth Darling

Judiciary 
 Lord President of the Court of Session and Lord Justice General – Lord Glencorse
 Lord Justice Clerk – Lord Moncreiff, then Lord Kingsburgh

Events 
 9 January – Crofters War: Aignish riot – Dispossessed crofters on Lewis face armed troops.
 15 March – transatlantic liner  is launched at John Brown & Company's shipyard at Clydebank.
 May–November – International Exhibition of Science, Art and Industry at Kelvingrove Park, Glasgow.
 July–August – first "Race to the North": Operators of the West and East Coast Main Line railways accelerate their services between London and Edinburgh.
 28 May – Celtic Football Club play their first official match, beating Rangers 5–2 in Glasgow.
 25 August – first Scottish Labour Party founded.
 24 September – Stock exchange opened at Greenock.
 15 October – Dundee Institute of Technology, predecessor of Abertay University, opens.
 c. December – completion of first stage of Edinburgh Museum of Science and Art.
 Lancashire textile machinery manufacturer John Bullough purchases the isle of Rùm.
 Opening of Carstairs House Tramway, a private railway powered by hydroelectricity and the first permanent electric railway in Scotland.

Births 
 3 January – James Bridie (O. H. Mavor), playwright (died 1951)
 13 February – Andrew Dewar Gibb, lawyer and Scottish National Party politician (died 1974)
 8 March – John Nicholson, footballer (died 1970 in England)
 19 April – Walter Elliot, Unionist politician (died 1958)
 6 June – Scottie Wilson, né Louis Freeman, artist (died 1972 in England)
 7 June – Hilda Matheson, pioneering radio talks producer, born in London (died 1940 in England)
 7 July – Edith Hughes, née Burnet, architect (died 1971)
 14 August – John Logie Baird, engineer and inventor (died 1946)
 5 September – Jack Miles, General Secretary of the Communist Party of Australia (died 1969 in Australia)
 7 October – Cecil Coles, composer (killed in action 1918)
 Approximate date – Alexander MacRae, clothing manufacturer (died 1938 in Australia)

Deaths 
 10 January – James Campbell Walker, Scottish architect (born 1821)
 May – James Salmon, architect (born 1805)
 30 May – William Hay, architect (born 1818)
 4 August – Lord Douglas Gordon, Liberal MP (born 1851)

The arts
 J. M. Barrie's Auld Licht Idylls is published.

See also 
 Timeline of Scottish history
 1888 in the United Kingdom

References 

 
Years of the 19th century in Scotland
Scotland
1880s in Scotland